In mathematical analysis and in probability theory, a σ-algebra (also σ-field) on a set X is a nonempty collection Σ of subsets of X closed under complement, countable unions, and countable intersections. The pair  is called a measurable space.

The σ-algebras are a subset of the set algebras; elements of the latter only need to be closed under the union or intersection of finitely many subsets, which is a weaker condition.

The main use of σ-algebras is in the definition of measures; specifically, the collection of those subsets for which a given measure is defined is necessarily a σ-algebra. This concept is important in mathematical analysis as the foundation for Lebesgue integration, and in probability theory, where it is interpreted as the collection of events which can be assigned probabilities. Also, in probability, σ-algebras are pivotal in the definition of conditional expectation.

In statistics, (sub) σ-algebras are needed for the formal mathematical definition of a sufficient statistic, particularly when the statistic is a function or a random process and the notion of conditional density is not applicable.

In general, a finite algebra is always a σ-algebra.

If  is a countable partition of  then the collection of all unions of sets in the partition (including the empty set) is a σ-algebra.

A more useful example is the set of subsets of the real line formed by starting with all open intervals and adding in all countable unions, countable intersections, and relative complements and continuing this process (by transfinite iteration through all countable ordinals) until the relevant closure properties are achieved (a construction known as the Borel hierarchy).

Motivation
There are at least three key motivators for σ-algebras: defining measures, manipulating limits of sets, and managing partial information characterized by sets.

Measure
We want the size of the union of disjoint sets to be the sum of their individual sizes, even for an infinite sequence of disjoint sets.

One would like to assign a size to  subset of  but in many natural settings, this is not possible. For example, the axiom of choice implies that when the size under consideration is the ordinary notion of length for subsets of the real line, then there exist sets for which no size exists, for example, the Vitali sets. For this reason, one considers instead a smaller collection of privileged subsets of  These subsets will be called the measurable sets. They are closed under operations that one would expect for measurable sets, that is, the complement of a measurable set is a measurable set and the countable union of measurable sets is a measurable set.  Non-empty collections of sets with these properties are called σ-algebras.

Limits of sets
Many uses of measure, such as the probability concept of almost sure convergence, involve limits of sequences of sets. For this, closure under countable unions and intersections is paramount. Set limits are defined as follows on σ-algebras.

That is,  if and only if there exists an infinite subsequence  (where ) of sets that all contain  that is, such that 

That is,  if and only if there exists an index  such that  all contain  that is, such that 

The inner limit is always a subset of the outer limit:  
If these two sets are equal then their limit  exists and is equal to this common set:

Sub σ-algebras
In much of probability, especially when conditional expectation is involved, one is concerned with sets that represent only part of all the possible information that can be observed. This partial information can be characterized with a smaller σ-algebra which is a subset of the principal σ-algebra; it consists of the collection of subsets relevant only to and determined only by the partial information. A simple example suffices to illustrate this idea.

Imagine you and another person are betting on a game that involves flipping a coin repeatedly and observing whether it comes up Heads or Tails. Since you and your opponent are each infinitely wealthy, there is no limit to how long the game can last.

However, after  flips of the coin, you may want to determine or revise your betting strategy in advance of the next flip. The observed information at that point can be described in terms of the 2n possibilities for the first  flips. Formally, since you need to use subsets of Ω, this is codified as the σ-algebra

Observe that then

where  is the smallest σ-algebra containing all the others.

Definition and properties

Definition
Let  be some set, and let  represent its power set. Then a subset  is called a σ-algebra if it satisfies the following three properties:

  is closed under complementation: If  is in  then so is its complement, 
  is closed under countable unions: If  are in  then so is 

From these properties, it follows that the σ-algebra is also closed under countable intersections (by applying De Morgan's laws).

Elements of the σ-algebra are called measurable sets. A function between two measurable spaces is called a measurable function if the preimage of every measurable set is measurable. The collection of measurable spaces forms a category, with the measurable functions as morphisms. Measures are defined as certain types of functions from a σ-algebra to 

A σ-algebra is both a π-system and a Dynkin system (λ-system). The converse is true as well, by Dynkin's theorem (below).

Dynkin's π-λ theorem

This theorem (or the related monotone class theorem) is an essential tool for proving many results about properties of specific σ-algebras. It capitalizes on the nature of two simpler classes of sets, namely the following.
 A π-system  is a collection of subsets of  that is closed under finitely many intersections, and
 A Dynkin system (or λ-system)  is a collection of subsets of  that contains  and is closed under complement and under countable unions of disjoint subsets.

Dynkin's π-λ Theorem then implies that all sets in  enjoy the property, avoiding the task of checking it for an arbitrary set in 

One of the most fundamental uses of the π-λ theorem is to show equivalence of separately defined measures or integrals. For example, it is used to equate a probability for a random variable  with the Lebesgue-Stieltjes integral typically associated with computing the probability:
 for all  in the Borel σ-algebra on 
where  is the cumulative distribution function for  defined on  while  is a probability measure, defined on a σ-algebra  of subsets of some sample space

Combining σ-algebras
Suppose  is a collection of σ-algebras on a space 

Meet

The intersection of a collection of σ-algebras is a σ-algebra. To emphasize its character as a σ-algebra, it often is denoted by: 

Sketch of Proof: Let  denote the intersection. Since  is in every  is not empty. Closure under complement and countable unions for every  implies the same must be true for  Therefore,  is a σ-algebra.

Join

The union of a collection of σ-algebras is not generally a σ-algebra, or even an algebra, but it generates a σ-algebra known as the join which typically is denoted 

A π-system that generates the join is 

Sketch of Proof: By the case  it is seen that each  so

This implies

by the definition of a σ-algebra generated by a collection of subsets. On the other hand,

which, by Dynkin's π-λ theorem, implies

σ-algebras for subspaces
 The collection  is a σ-algebra of subsets of 
 Suppose  is a measurable space. The collection  is a σ-algebra of subsets of

Relation to σ-ring
A σ-algebra  is just a σ-ring that contains the universal set  A σ-ring need not be a σ-algebra, as for example measurable subsets of zero Lebesgue measure in the real line are a σ-ring, but not a σ-algebra since the real line has infinite measure and thus cannot be obtained by their countable union. If, instead of zero measure, one takes measurable subsets of finite Lebesgue measure, those are a ring but not a σ-ring, since the real line can be obtained by their countable union yet its measure is not finite.

Typographic note
σ-algebras are sometimes denoted using calligraphic capital letters, or the Fraktur typeface.

Particular cases and examples

Separable σ-algebras
Note that any -algebra generated by a countable collection of sets is separable, but the converse need not hold. For example, the Lebesgue -algebra is separable (since every Lebesgue measurable set is equivalent to some Borel set) but not countably generated (since its cardinality is higher than continuum).

A separable measure space has a natural pseudometric that renders it separable as a pseudometric space.  The distance between two sets is defined as the measure of the symmetric difference of the two sets.  Note that the symmetric difference of two distinct sets can have measure zero; hence the pseudometric as defined above need not to be a true metric.  However, if sets whose symmetric difference has measure zero are identified into a single equivalence class, the resulting quotient set can be properly metrized by the induced metric.  If the measure space is separable, it can be shown that the corresponding metric space is, too.

Simple set-based examples
Let  be any set.
 The family consisting only of the empty set and the set  called the minimal or trivial σ-algebra over 
 The power set of  called the discrete σ-algebra.
 The collection  is a simple σ-algebra generated by the subset 
This is the σ-algebra generated by the singletons of  Note: "countable" includes finite or empty.

Stopping time sigma-algebras
A stopping time  can define a -algebra  the
so-called stopping time sigma-algebra, which in a filtered probability space describes the information up to the random time  in the sense that, if the filtered probability space is interpreted as a random experiment, the maximum information that can be found out about the experiment from arbitrarily often repeating it until the time  is

σ-algebras generated by families of sets

σ-algebra generated by an arbitrary family

It is, in fact, the intersection of all σ-algebras containing  (See intersections of σ-algebras above.) This σ-algebra is denoted  and is called the σ-algebra generated by 

For a simple example, consider the set  Then the σ-algebra generated by the single subset  is 
 

There are many families of subsets that generate useful σ-algebras. Some of these are presented here.

σ-algebra generated by a function

A function  from a set  to a set  is measurable with respect to a σ-algebra  of subsets of  if and only if  is a subset of 

A useful property is the following.

Borel and Lebesgue σ-algebras
An important example is the Borel algebra over any topological space: the σ-algebra generated by the open sets (or, equivalently, by the closed sets). Note that this σ-algebra is not, in general, the whole power set. For a non-trivial example that is not a Borel set, see the Vitali set or Non-Borel sets.

On the Euclidean space  another σ-algebra is of importance: that of all Lebesgue measurable sets.

Product σ-algebra
Let  and  be two measurable spaces. The σ-algebra for the corresponding product space  is called the product σ-algebra and is defined by

Observe that  is a π-system.

For example,

For each of these two examples, the generating family is a π-system.

σ-algebra generated by cylinder sets

Suppose

is a set of real-valued functions.

Each

is a π-system that generates a σ-algebra  Then the family of subsets

is an algebra that generates the cylinder σ-algebra for  This σ-algebra is a subalgebra of the Borel σ-algebra determined by the product topology of  restricted to 

In this case, it suffices to consider the cylinder sets

for which

is a non-decreasing sequence of σ-algebras.

σ-algebra generated by random variable or vector
Suppose  is a probability space. If  is measurable with respect to the Borel σ-algebra on  then  is called a random variable or random vector.

σ-algebra generated by a stochastic process

the σ-algebra generated by the inverse images of cylinder sets.

See also

References

External links

 
 Sigma Algebra from PlanetMath.

Boolean algebra
Experiment (probability theory)
Families of sets
Measure theory